WGZS is a non-commercial FM radio station operating on 89.1 MHz from a transmitter on the Fond du Lac Indian Reservation in rural St. Louis County north of Cloquet.  The station's coverage range includes portions of Aitkin, Carlton, Douglas and St. Louis counties, including all of Cloquet and large portions of Duluth and Superior. The station currently operates 24 hours a day, 7 days a week with a mix of mainstream American and Native American music, as well as regional and American Indian-oriented programming and local weather, events, and school closings.

The station is staffed by Dan Huculak and Pat Puchalla.

Programs carried by WGZS 89.1
 American Indian Living
 Earth Songs
 Indigenous in Music with Larry K
 Native America Calling
 Native Voice One
 Peace Talks Radio
 Voices from the Circle
 Minnesota Native News
 UnderCurrents
 Minnesota Military Radio
 Veterans Voices

See also
List of community radio stations in the United States

References

External links
Facebook page
WGZS website

Radio stations in Minnesota
Community radio stations in the United States
Native American radio
Fond du Lac Band of Lake Superior Chippewa